Calliostoma vicdani is a species of sea snail, a marine gastropod mollusk in the family Calliostomatidae.

Some authors place this taxon in the subgenus Calliostoma (Kombologion).

Description
The size of the shell varies between 20 mm and 33 mm.

Distribution
This marine species occurs off the Philippines.

References

External links
 

vicdani
Gastropods described in 1984